The 1944 March Field Flyers football team represented the United States Army Air Forces' Fourth Air Force stationed at March Field during the 1944 college football season. The base was located in Riverside, California. The team compiled a 7–2–2 record, outscored all opponents by a total of 222 to 81, and was ranked No. 10 in the final AP Poll.

In individual games of note, the Flyers defeated UCLA, Washington, and the San Diego Bombers, champions of Pacific Coast Professional Football League.  Their losses were to the Washington Redskins of the NFL and the Randolph Field team that was ranked No. 3 in the final AP Poll.

The team was coached by Major Paul J. Schissler, a former NFL coach.

Schedule

References

March Field
March Field Flyers football seasons
March Field Flyers football